Abolhassan Astaneh-Asl (born 1947 in Tabriz) is an Iranian-American academic, structural engineer and professor at University of California, Berkeley. He was one of the leading structural engineers to investigate the collapse of the World Trade Center towers on the September 11 attacks.

References

20th-century Iranian engineers
Iranian expatriate academics
Amirkabir University of Technology alumni
UC Berkeley College of Engineering faculty
University of Michigan College of Engineering alumni
Scientists from Tabriz
1947 births
Living people
Iranian emigrants to the United States
American people of Iranian-Azerbaijani descent